Iridopsis sancta is a species of geometrid moth in the family Geometridae.

The MONA or Hodges number for Iridopsis sancta is 6579.

References

Further reading

 

Boarmiini
Articles created by Qbugbot
Moths described in 1966